Andrew A. Luckey (born October 7, 1965) is an American animator, artist, author, designer, director, illustrator and television producer, primarily of animated works. He also writes and illustrates children's books and Bible studies.

Luckey has produced over 300 hours of programming and was most notably a producer on the 1980s-'90's animated TV series Teenage Mutant Ninja Turtles (which earned five Emmy nominations) and Adventures from the Book of Virtues. He is also the author and illustrator of the children's book series Spin & Sparkle.

He is the son of animator, director and voice actor Bud Luckey (1934–2018) and a maternal cousin, twice removed, of Animator Earl Hurd (1880–1940) who co-created (with J.R. Bray) and patented the process for Cel Animation—a key component of traditional animation.

Early work
Luckey learned the craft of animation in his family's studio in San Francisco under his father, animator Bud Luckey. That studio produced numerous animated and combined live-animated television commercials and short films for The Children's Television Workshop's (now known as Sesame Workshop) series Sesame Street.

Following high school, Luckey briefly worked as a Visual Effects Designer for the Mill Valley, California, based studio Audio Vision Projects. His most notable work there was co-designing, with famed Cinematographer Katsuya Ushino, the visual effects for the MTV music video of "Turn of the Century" featuring the Atlantic Records progressive British rock group Yes and vocalist Jon Anderson. The video was the directorial debut of Brian G. Smith who later came to fame as a director of fantasy sci-fi films.

High school and undergraduate education

Luckey initially attended The Admiral Farragut Academy but left after his first year to return to a civilian high school in Marin County, California.  He had an initial ambition to pursue a career as a Naval Officer.

After making an early departure from Redwood High School in the Spring of 1983, Redwood High School being a notably unusual institution made famous by the comedy routines of fellow alumnus, comedian Robin Williams (Class of '69), Luckey proceeded to The College of Marin – also an alma mater and occasional comedy fodder for Robin Williams. Willams and Luckey attended both schools over a decade apart and have only met casually on a handful of occasions, most of which were unrelated to either school.    Luckey is an acquaintance of former San Francisco Mayor and current California Lieutenant Governor Gavin Newsom who was two years behind him at Redwood High School. Newsome was a star baseball player for the school and Luckey an avid baseball fan.

Luckey initially enrolled as a pre-med/biology student but decided in his third semester to move to film making and screenwriting. "The hell that is 'O-Chem' (organic chemistry) drove me from premed to film school and, in so doing, probably saved countless lives", Luckey told the College of Marin school newspaper in a 1984 survey on why people changed majors.

In 1986, Luckey continued on to the California State University Northridge, entering what was then known as the Radio-Television Film (RTVF) program of the university's College of Arts and Professional Studies (CAPS). In the early 2000s the school was renamed after alumnus Mike Curb, a former Lieutenant Governor of California and record mogul founder of Curb Records. There Luckey was primarily mentored by his Faculty Advisor Alan Armer, the founding President of the Academy of Television Arts & Sciences and Producer of the 1960s series The Untouchables and The Fugitive and the 70s series Cannon. Another key influence on Luckey was screenwriter-producer Benjamin Brady, the former President of ABC Television who had produced the series Perry Mason and co-created, with Raymond Burr, the series Ironside. Luckey also studied under such industry veterans as Nat Perrin (The Adams Family), Tom Burrows (director of the '60 Kennedy-Nixon TV debate), Peter Stearn( Happy Days, The Partridge Family), Beretta and Dr. Kildare writer-producer Irv Pearlberg and Academy Award (Oscar)-winning writer-director Sydney Salkow who, despite his work on over 75 feature films, was best known as the producer of Lassie, I Love Lucy and its follow-up The Lucy Show. Luckey received his B.A. in Radio-Television-Film, Media Management in 1988.

Luckey is a member of the Sigma Nu fraternity, Iota Upsilon chapter, which he joined at California State University, Northridge in 1986.  He remains an active Sigma Nu Alumnus.

Licensing and merchandising
Following graduation, Luckey worked for a time as the Los Angeles office's Assistant Branch Manager for The Sunrise Company, KK of Japan. In that role he co-managed Japanese licensing of various western properties for the Asian market including The Simpsons, The Adventures of Tintin, Lone Wolf and Cub, Jean Giraud—a/k/a Moebius and the properties of George Lucas's Lucasfilm, Ltd. Luckey also managed product placement of Japanese products in U.S. films—most notably the placement of JVC's products in the Back to the Future and Beverly Hills Cop film series as well as the films Days of Thunder and Black Rain.

Murakami Wolf Swenson – and The Teenage Mutant Ninja Turtles
From 1989 to 1992, Luckey worked as a producer for the Burbank, California, and Dublin, Ireland studios of Murakami Wolf Swenson—the studio run by veteran animators Jimmy Murakami and Fred Wolf. That studio was later renamed Fred Wolf Films. Luckey's most notable work during that time was on the animated TV series Teenage Mutant Ninja Turtles, based on the Mirage Studios comics by Kevin Eastman and Peter Laird, and "Five Decades with The Chimpmunks, Rockin Through the Years" – featuring Ross Bagdasarian's characters of David Seville and the Chimpmunks—Alvin, Simon and Theodore—sometimes known as Alvin and the Chipmunks.

Video games
From 1992 to 1998, Luckey was involved in the video game industry including stints as a Director and Executive Producer for Sir Richard Branson's Virgin Interactive, President and chief operating officer of Pure Interactive Entertainment and Principal and Executive Producer- Interactive for The Krislin Company. Luckey's most notable work of this time was the video game derivative of Walt Disney's Aladdin which was co-produced by Walt Disney Feature Animation and Virgin Interactive.  Luckey continues to be active in advising on video game production and is an active member of the International Game Developers Association (IGDA) as well as ACM/SIGGRAPH—The Association of Computing Machinery's Special Interest Group in Graphics and Interactive Technology.  ACM/SIGGRAPH named him a Computer Graphics Pioneer Member in 2007.

Seminary and ministry
From 1998 to 2001 Luckey took a self-imposed sabbatical to earn a Master of Divinity, M.Div, degree from Biola University's Talbot School of Theology. He worked as a Youth Pastor and College and Career Pastor during that time for several churches in Southern California.

Symaxxis, Inc.
From 2001 to 2003 Luckey served as the interim chief executive and as a Corporate Director of Symaxxis, Inc. along with that company's co-founder Geoffrey Mark, who served as Chief Visionary Officer.  Symaxxis, Inc. is a Los Angeles-based biometric science company. He left those positions upon forming Greater Family, LLC in 2003.

Greater Family, LLC and Greater Family Press
Greater Family, LLC was formed in 2003 with Andy Luckey as a co-founder and President. It is a family oriented media company headquartered in Ridgefield, Connecticut—a suburb of New York City

Industry speaking and writing
Luckey is a frequent speaker at industry events including SIGGRAPH and The Game Developer's Conference.

Luckey has co-authored and co-edited two white papers for the International Game Developer's Association, IGDA. The first was on intellectual property rights for game developers and the second on quality of life in the game industry.

Luckey is a longtime member of the International Game Developer's Association IGDA and is a founding member of its committees on Intellectual Property Rights and Quality of Life in the Game Industry.  He is also A Voting Member of ASIFA Hollywood—The branch of the International Animated Film Society which confers the prestigious Annie Award and ASIFA International, The Institute of Electronic and Electrical Engineers (IEEE) a Professional Member of The Association for Computing Machinery ACM and its special interest groups on Computer Graphics and Interactive Technologies SIGGRAPH (which named him a "Computer Graphics Pioneer" in 2006), Mobile Computing SIGMOBILE and Computer-Human Interaction SIGCHI.

Civil Air Patrol

Luckey is an officer in the Connecticut Wing of the Civil Air Patrol—The United States Air Force Auxiliary.

Education
Luckey holds a Bachelor of Arts (BA) from the California State University, Northridge's Mike Curb College of Arts, Media, and Communication and a Master of Divinity (M.Div.) from Biola University's Talbot School of Theology.

Sources
 http://www.greaterfamily.com/
 http://www.spin-n-sparkle.com/
 https://web.archive.org/web/20070609125240/http://www.panda3d.org/acm/biopics/luckey.jpg
 https://web.archive.org/web/20070609125012/http://www.panda3d.org/acm/program.html
 http://portal.acm.org/citation.cfm?id=1179171.1179175&coll=GUIDE&dl=&type=series&idx=1179171&part=series&WantType=series&title=International%20Conference%20on%20Computer%20Graphics%20and%20Interactive%20Techniques&CFID=15151515&CFTOKEN=6184618
 http://www.kidscreen.com/articles/magazine/19960101/16844.html?word=Luckey

External links
 Greater Family's Website
 Website for the Spin & Sparkle book series by Andy Luckey – Greater Family Press
 
 
 https://web.archive.org/web/20070621162802/http://www.csun.edu/~ctva/Alumni/AlumniHTML/NetworkingListA.html
 SIGGRAPH 2007
 http://sandbox.siggraph.org/archives/program06.html
 http://www.siggraph.org/s2006/main.php?f=media&p=factsheets&s=factsheet8
 http://www.igda.org/
 Krislin To Expand

1965 births
Living people
Admiral Farragut Academy alumni
American animators
American animated film directors
American animated film producers
American children's book illustrators
American male screenwriters
American television directors
California State University, Northridge alumni
College of Marin alumni
People from Ridgefield, Connecticut
Screenwriters from California
Screenwriters from Connecticut
Talbot School of Theology alumni
Television producers from California
Television producers from Connecticut
Writers from San Francisco